Laxmi Gautam is an Indian politician and was a member of the 16th Legislative Assembly of Uttar Pradesh of India. She represented the Chandausi constituency of Uttar Pradesh and is a member of the Samajwadi Party.

Early life and education
Laxmi Gautam was born in Budaun, Uttar Pradesh. She holds Master of Arts degree from M. J. P. Rohilkhand University. Gautam belongs to the scheduled caste community.

Political career
Laxmi Gautam has been a MLA for one term. She represented the Chandausi constituency and is a member of the Samajwadi Party.

Posts Held

See also
Chandausi
Politics of India
Sixteenth Legislative Assembly of Uttar Pradesh
Uttar Pradesh Legislative Assembly

References 

Samajwadi Party politicians
Uttar Pradesh MLAs 2012–2017
People from Budaun district
1979 births
Living people
People from Chandausi